Terbium fluoride may refer to:

 Terbium(III) fluoride (Terbium trifluoride), TbF3
 Terbium(IV) fluoride (Terbium tetrafluoride), TbF4